Remington Outdoor Company (ROC) was an American firearms manufacturer and holding company. The company had notable brands under its umbrella, such as Bushmaster, DPMS, Remington and Marlin.

History

On August 15, 2017, James Marcotuli announced his resignation as CEO, citing personal reasons. On October 25, the company announced that Anthony Acitelli would succeed Marcotuli.

The families of nine victims and a teacher who was shot and survived in the Sandy Hook shooting, in which 20 children and six adult staff were fatally shot, filed a wrongful death lawsuit against Remington, a firearms wholesaler, and a firearms dealer, seeking a jury trial to recover unspecified damages. In 2016 the suit was dismissed by the Connecticut Superior Court citing the immunity provided to firearms manufacturers by the federal Protection of Lawful Commerce in Arms Act of 2005. The suit was delayed by Remington's 2018 bankruptcy. On March 14, 2019 the Connecticut Supreme Court ruled that the suit's wrongful marketing claim could proceed under Connecticut's Unfair Trade Practices Law. The Connecticut Supreme Court decision was "a significant development in the long-running battle between gun control advocates and the gun lobby" according to The New York Times and "groundbreaking" according to The Washington Post.

Remington filed for Chapter 11 bankruptcy protection in March 2018, having accumulated over $950 million in debt. Remington exited bankruptcy in May, less than two months after filing for protection under Ch. 11 laws. Remington's quick exit from bankruptcy was due to a pre-approved restructuring plan that was supported by 97% of its creditors. On 28 July 2020, it filed again for Chapter 11 bankruptcy protection.

In the bankruptcy auction in September 2020 Remington was sold in parts to:

 Vista Outdoor: the Lonoke ammunition business and certain intellectual property.
 Roundhill Group: the non-Marlin firearms business
 Sierra Bullets: the Barnes ammunition business
 Sturm, Ruger & Co.: the Marlin firearms business
 JJE Capital Holdings: the DPMS, H&R, Stormlake, AAC and Parker brands
 Franklin Armory: the Bushmaster brand and some related assets
 Sportsman's Warehouse: the Tapco brands
 Dakota Arms: Parkwest Arms

References

Further reading

External links 
 

Remington Arms
American companies established in 2007
American companies disestablished in 2020
Firearm manufacturers of the United States
Cerberus Capital Management companies
Manufacturing companies based in North Carolina
Private equity portfolio companies
Manufacturing companies established in 2007
Manufacturing companies disestablished in 2020
2007 establishments in North Carolina
Rockingham County, North Carolina
Companies that filed for Chapter 11 bankruptcy in 2018
Companies that filed for Chapter 11 bankruptcy in 2020